"Stay" is the debut single of American singer-songwriter Ne-Yo, taken from his debut studio album, In My Own Words (2006). It was written by Ne-Yo, Ron "Neff-U" Feemster, Ray Blaylock, Solomon Ridge Jr., and rapper Peedi Peedi, who is also featured on the song. Production on "Stay" was overseen Feemster. The song incorporates an interpolation of American musical group DeBarge's "Stay with Me" (1983). Due to the inclusion of the sample, writers Mark DeBarge, and Etterlene Jordan are also credited as songwriters.

The video for "Stay", directed by Jessy Terrero, premiered on the BET and VH1 networks in September 2005, and on MTV's TRL in November 2005. The single failed to chart on the Billboard Hot 100 when it was released in the US, however, the song proved to be a success on Billboards Hot R&B/Hip-Hop Songs, peaking at number 36, Ne-Yo's first single to do so as a solo artist. "Stay" also reached the top ten of the Finnish Singles Chart.

Track listings

Charts

References

2005 debut singles
2005 songs
Def Jam Recordings singles
Ne-Yo songs
Peedi Crakk songs
Song recordings produced by Theron Feemster
Songs written by Ne-Yo
Songs written by Theron Feemster